This is a list of awards and nominations received by Japanese singer-songwriter and actor Gen Hoshino.

Music awards

CD Shop Awards

!
|-
!scope="row"|2011
|Baka no Uta
|Finalist Award
|
|
|-
!scope="row"|2012
|Episode
|Grand Prix
|
|
|-
!scope="row"|2014
|Stranger
|Finalist Award
|
|
|-
!scope="row"|2015
|Stranger in Budoukan
|Live Video Award
|
|
|-
!scope="row"|2016
|Yellow Dancer
|Grand Prix
|
|
|-
!scope="row"|2019
|Pop Virus
|Grand Prix (Red)
|
|

Crunchyroll Anime Awards

!
|-
!scope="row" rowspan="2"| 2023
|rowspan="2"|"Comedy"
|Best Ending Sequence
|
|rowspan="2"|
|-
|Best Anime Song
|

Japan Gold Disc Awards

!
|-
!scope="row" rowspan="2"| 2017
|rowspan="2"|"Koi"
|Song of the Year by Download
|
|rowspan="2"|
|-
|rowspan="2"|Best 5 Songs by Download
|
|-
!scope="row" rowspan="2"| 2019
|"Idea"
|
|
|-
|Pop Virus
|Best 5 Albums
|
|

Japan Record Awards

!
|-
!scope="row"| 2016
|Yellow Dancer
|Excellence Album Award
|
|

JASRAC Awards

!
|-
!scope="row"| 2018
|"Koi"
|Gold Award
|
|

MTV Video Music Awards Japan

!
|-
!scope="row"|2012
|"Film"
|Best Male Video
|
|
|-
!scope="row"|2014
|"Why Don't You Play in Hell?"
|Best Video from a Film
|
|
|-
!scope="row"|2015
|"Sun"
|Best Male Video – Japan
|
|
|-
!scope="row" rowspan="3"|2017
|rowspan="2"|"Family Song"
|Best Video of the Year
|
|rowspan="3"|
|-
|Best Japanese Male Artist Video
|
|-
|"Koi"
|Best Choreography
|
|-
!scope="row" rowspan="2"|2018
|rowspan="2"|"Idea"
|Best Pop Video
|
|rowspan="2"|
|-
|Best Art Direction Video
|
|-

Music Jacket Awards

!
|-
!scope="row"|2014
|"Gag"
|rowspan="3"| Grand Prix
|
|
|-
!scope="row"|2015
|"Crazy Crazy/Sakura no Mori"
|
|
|-
!scope="row"|2016
|Yellow Dancer
|
|
|-

Space Shower Awards

Space Shower Music Awards

!
|-
!scope="row"|2016
|Gen Hoshino
|Best Male Artist
|
|
|-
!scope="row" rowspan="2"|2017
|Gen Hoshino
|Best Male Artist
|
|rowspan="2"|
|-
|"Koi"
|Video of the Year
|
|-
!scope="row" rowspan="3"|2018
|rowspan="2"|Gen Hoshino
|People's Choice
|
|rowspan="3"|
|-
|Best Male Artist
|
|-
|"Family Song"
|Best Art Direction Video 
|
|-
!scope="row" rowspan="4"|2019
|rowspan="3"|Gen Hoshino
|Best Pop Artist
|
|rowspan="4"|
|-
|Artist of the Year
|
|-
|People's Choice
|
|-
|Pop Virus
|Album of the Year
|
|-
!scope="row" rowspan="2"|2020
|Gen Hoshino
|BEST INFLUENTIAL ARTIST
|
|rowspan="2"|
|-
|Same Thing (feat. Superorganism)
|BEST COLLABORATION
|

Space Shower Music Video Awards

!
|-
!scope="row"|2013
|"Yume no Soto he"
|rowspan="3"|Best Video of the Year
|
|
|-
!scope="row"|2014
|"Bakemono"
|
|
|-
!scope="row"|2015
|"Crazy Crazy"
|
|
|-

Television Drama Academy Awards

!
|-
!scope="row"|2015
|"Sun"
|rowspan="4"|Best Theme Song
|
|
|-
!scope="row"|2016
|"Koi"
|
|
|-
!scope="row"|2017
|"Family Song"
|
|
|-
!scope="row"|2018
|"Idea"
|
|
|-

Tokyo Drama Awards

!
|-
!scope="row"|2017
|"Koi"
|Best Theme Song
|
|
|-

Acting awards

Blue Ribbon Awards

!
|-
!scope="row"|2021
|The Voice of Sin
|Best Supporting Actor
|
|
|-

Confidence Award Drama Prize

!
|-
!scope="row"|2016
|The Full-Time Wife Escapist
|Best Supporting Actor
|
|
|-

Elan d'or Awards

!
|-
!scope="row"|2017
|Dr. Storks, Sanada Maru and The Full-Time Wife Escapist
|Newcomer of the Year
|
|
|-

Japan Academy Film Prize

!
|-
!scope="row"|2014
|Blindly in Love and Why Don't You Play in Hell?
|Newcomer of the Year
|
|
|-
!scope="row"|2021
|The Voice of Sin
|Best Supporting Actor
|
|
|-

Japanese Movie Critics Awards

!
|-
!scope="row"|2013
|Blindly in Love
|Best Newcomer
|
|
|-

Mainichi Film Awards

!
|-
!scope="row"|2014
|Blindly in Love
|Sponichi Grand Prix Newcomer Award
|
|
|-

Nikkan Sports Drama Grand Prix

!
|-
!scope="row" rowspan="2"|2016
|rowspan="2"|The Full-Time Wife Escapist
|Best Supporting Actor – Fall
|
|
|-
|Best Supporting Actor
|
|
|-

Seoul International Drama Awards

!
|-
!scope="row"|2017
|The Full-Time Wife Escapist
|Best Actor
|
|
|-

Tama Cinema Awards

!
|-
!scope="row"|2013
|Blindly in Love, Why Don't You Play in Hell? and Saint Young Men
|Best Newcomer Actor
|
|
|-

Television Drama Academy Awards

!
|-
!scope="row"|2016
|The Full-Time Wife Escapist
|Best Supporting Actor
|
|
|-

Yokohama Film Festival

!
|-
!scope="row"|2013
|Blindly in Love and Why Don't You Play in Hell?
| Best Newcomer
|
|
|-

Hochi Film Awards

!
|-
!scope="row"|2020
|The Voice of Sin
|Best Supporting Actor
|
|
|-

Others

!
|-
!colspan="5" align="center"|Booklog Grand Prix
|-
!scope="row"|2017
|Inochi no Shasou kara
| Essay or Nonfiction Grand Prix
|
|
|-
!colspan="5" align="center"|Galaxy Awards
|-
!scope="row" rowspan="2"|2017
|Gen Hoshino
|DJ Personality Award
|
|
|-
|rowspan="2"|Ogen-san to Issho
|Galaxy Award – May
|
|
|-
!scope="row" rowspan="2"|2018
|Honorable Mention – Television
|
|rowspan="2"|
|-
|Hoshino Gen no All Night Nippon "Doraemon Special!"
|Honorable Mention – Radio
|
|-
!colspan="5" align="center"|Itami Juzo Prize
|-
!scope="row"|2017
|Gen Hoshino
|Itami Juzo Prize
|
|

Notes

References

Hoshino, Gen
Lists of awards received by actor